The emperor of Ethiopia (nəgusä nägäst, "King of Kings"), also known as the Atse ("emperor"), was the hereditary ruler of the Ethiopian Empire, from at least the 13th century until the abolition of the monarchy in 1975. The emperor was the head of state and head of government, with ultimate executive, judicial and legislative power in that country. A National Geographic article from 1965 called imperial Ethiopia "nominally a constitutional monarchy; in fact [it was] a benevolent autocracy".

Title and style
When we talk about the ancient history of Ethiopia (just consult the mapping of the events: Yeha, Axum, Dogali, Adwa, etc ) we refer to the specific history of the plateau of Ethiopia in North regions, that also included the territory today  Eritrea (This during colonialism ceded to the Italians first, to the British after, to preserve the kingdom despite resistance) 
Eritrea became independent only in 1991 from Ethiopia, after the longest partisan struggle of Africa (30 years). 
We refer also to some part of Yemen (Saba).

The title "King of Kings", often rendered imprecisely in English as "emperor", dates back to ancient Mesopotamia, but was used in Axum by King Sembrouthes (c. 250 AD). However, Yuri Kobishchanov dates this usage to the period following the Persian victory over the Romans in 296–297. The most notable pre-Solomonic usage of the title "Negusa Nagast" was by Ezana of Axum; despite this, prior to the beginning of the Solomonic Dynasty, most Axumite and Zagwe rulers went by negus. Its use, from at least the reign of Menelik I onward, meant that both subordinate officials and tributary rulers, notably the gubernatorial vassals of Gojjam (who ranked 12th in the states non-dynastic protocol as per 1690), Welega, the seaward provinces and later Shewa, received the honorific title of nəgus, a word for "king."
 
The consort of the emperor was referred to as the ətege. Empress Zewditu used the feminized form nəgəstä nägäst ("Queen of Kings") to show that she reigned in her own right, and did not use the title of ətege.

Succession
On the death of a monarch any male or female blood relative of the emperor could claim succession to the throne: sons, brothers, daughters and nephews all inherited at times. Practice favoured primogeniture (first-born child ascending to the throne) but did not always enforce it. The system developed two approaches to controlling the succession: the first, employed on occasion before the 20th century, involved interning all of the emperor's possible rivals in a secure location, which drastically limited their ability to disrupt the empire with revolts or to dispute the succession of an heir apparent; the second, used with increasing frequency, involved the selection of emperors by a council of the senior officials of the realm, both secular and religious.

Ethiopian traditions do not all agree as to exactly when the custom started of imprisoning rivals to the throne on a Mountain of the Princes. One tradition credits this practice to the Zagwe king Yemrehana Krestos (fl. 11th century), who allegedly received the idea in a dream; Taddesse Tamrat discredits this tradition, arguing that the records of the Zagwe dynasty betray too many disputed successions for this to have been the case. Another tradition, recorded by historian Thomas Pakenham, states that this practice predates the Zagwe dynasty (which ruled from ca. 900 AD), and was first practiced on Debre Damo, which was captured by the 10th-century queen Yodit or "Gudit", who then isolated 200 princes there to death; however, Pakenham also notes that when questioned, the abbot of the monastery on Debre Damo knew of no such tale.
Taddesse Tamrat argues that this practice began in the reign of Wedem Arad (1299–1314), following the struggle for succession that he believes lies behind the series of brief reigns of the sons of Yagbe'u Seyon (reigned 1285–1294).
A constructivist approach states that the tradition was used on occasion, weakened or lapsed sometimes, and was sometimes revived to full effect after some unfortunate disputes – and that the custom started in time immemorial as Ethiopian common inheritance patterns allowed all agnates to also succeed to the lands of the monarchy – which however is contrary to keeping the country undivided.

The potential royal rivals were incarcerated at Amba Geshen until the site was destroyed in 1540 during the Ethiopian-Adal war; then, from the reign of Fasilides (1632–1667) until the mid-18th century, at Wehni. Rumors of these royal mountain residences were part of the inspiration for Samuel Johnson's short story, Rasselas.

Although the emperor of Ethiopia had theoretically unlimited power over his subjects, his councillors came to play an increasing role in governing Ethiopia, because many emperors were succeeded either by a child, or one of the incarcerated princes, who could only successfully leave their prisons with help from the outside. As a result, by the mid-18th century the power of the emperor had been largely transferred to his deputies, like Ras Mikael Sehul of Tigray (ca. 1691 – 1779), who held actual power in the empire and elevated or deposed emperors at will.

Ideology
The emperors of Ethiopia derived their right to rule based on two dynastic claims: their descent from the kings of Axum, and their descent from Menelik I, the son of Solomon and Makeda, Queen of Sheba.

The claim to their relationship to the Kings of Axum derives from Yakuno Amlak's claim that he was the descendant of Dil Na'od, through his father, although he defeated and killed the last Zagwe king in battle. His claim to the throne was also helped by his marriage to that king's daughter, even though Ethiopians commonly do not acknowledge claims from the distaff side. The claim of descent from Menelik I is based on the assertion that the kings of Axum were also the descendants of Menelik I; its definitive and best-known formulation is set forth in the Kebra Nagast. While the surviving records of these kings fail to shed light on their origins, this genealogical claim was first documented in the 10th century by an Arab historian. Interpretations of this claim vary widely. Some (including many inside Ethiopia) accept it as evident fact. At the other extreme, others (mostly interested non-Ethiopians) understand this as an expression of propaganda, attempting to connect the legitimacy of the state to the Ethiopian Orthodox Tewahedo Church. Some scholars take an approach in the middle, attempting to either find a connection between Axum and the South Arabian kingdom of Saba, or between Axum and the pre-exilic Kingdom of Judah. Due to lack of primary materials, it is not possible  to determine which theory is the more plausible.

History
The restored Solomonic dynasty, which claimed descent from the old Aksumite rulers, ruled Ethiopia from the 13th century until 1974.

Modern era
The Amhara warrior turned emperor, Kassa of Qwara, Gonder, in 1855 took complete control over Ethiopia and was crowned Tewodros II. Of the valley nobility, he claimed paternal descent from Emperor Fasilides, by way of one of the aforementioned emperor's daughters. After Tewodros' reign, one of the many rebels leaders that helped the British in their expedition into Abyssinia was Dejazmatch Kassa, he was rewarded with articles of war for his services and went on to assume power through his claim of Solomonic descent from his mothers Gondarian ancestry and was crowned Yohannes IV. Menelik of Shewa, who descended from Solomonic emperors directly paternally through the Shewan Branch (junior only to the Gondar line), ascended the imperial throne following Yohannes IV's death, thus purporting to restore the male-line Solomonic tradition.

The emperor Tewodros spent his youth fighting with invading Ottoman Egyptians (termed 'Turks' by the Ethiopians), then unifying the empire after the dark age of the 'Zemene Mesafint' (Era of the Princes). Yohannes IV defeated an invading Egyptian army in modern day Eritrea and gave his life to end the Mahdist threat to Ethiopia. Emperor Menelik II achieved a major military victory against Italian invaders in March 1896 at the Battle of Adwa and conquered the modern borders of Ethiopia. After Menelik, all monarchs were of distaff descent from Solomonics. The male line, through the descendants of Menelik's cousin Dejazmatch Taye Gulilat, still existed, but had been pushed aside largely because of Menelik's personal distaste for this branch of his family. Menelik's successors ruled the country until the military coup in 1974.

Italian occupation of Ethiopia

Italy under Benito Mussolini attacked Ethiopia in 1935, starting the Second Italo-Ethiopian War. Italian successes in the war caused the emperor Haile Selassie to be voted into exile by his nobles in 1936; he pled Ethiopia's case against Italy before the League of Nations, but aid from the League was not forthcoming. Italy added Ethiopia to its already existing colonies of Eritrea and Italian Somalia, creating the new dependent state of Italian East Africa and was the first to associate Ethiopia as part of the Horn of Africa. On 9 May 1936, King Victor Emmanuel III of Italy proclaimed himself emperor of Ethiopia, replacing Haile Selassie.

Victor Emmanuel's claim to emperorship was not entirely accepted, with the Soviet Union never considering the Italian conquest legitimate, and Haile Selassie continuing to contest the occupation from exile in the United Kingdom. With Italy's entry on the side of the Axis Powers in World War II, the African part of the British Empire aided Haile Selassie and anti-Italian Ethiopian forces in the East African campaign. Italy was defeated and Selassie restored to the throne, with most combat in Ethiopia ending in 1941. The Armistice of Cassibile was signed in September 1943 with the Kingdom of Italy's surrender, and Victor Emmanuel III officially renounced his title as emperor of Ethiopia in November 1943.

Return of Haile Selassie, post-war period, and end of the monarchy
In January 1942, Selassie was officially reinstated to power in Ethiopia. The position of the emperor and the line of succession were strictly defined in both of the constitutions adopted during the reign of Haile Selassie: the one adopted on July 16, 1931; and the revised one of November 1955.

Haile Selassie was the last Solomonic monarch to rule Ethiopia. He was deposed by the Derg, the committee of lower-ranking military and police officials on September 12, 1974. The Derg offered the throne to Haile Selassie's son Amha Selassie, who – understandably mistrustful of the Derg – refused to return to Ethiopia to rule. The Derg abolished the monarchy on 21 March 1975. In April 1989, Amha Selassie was proclaimed emperor in exile at London, with his succession backdated to the date of Emperor Haile Selassie's death in August 1975 rather than his deposition in September 1974. In 1993 a group called the "Crown Council of Ethiopia", which included several descendants of Haile Selassie, affirmed Amha as emperor and legal head of Ethiopia. However, the 1995 Constitution of Ethiopia confirmed the abolition of the monarchy.

Symbols

Family tree

 (Note: This family tree only includes the historical figures' paternal ancestries)
|-
|style="text-align: left;"|  style="border-spacing: 2px; border: 1px solid darkgray;"
+Legend
 
 EMPEROR (bold, capital letters)

-
 
 Marriage

-
 
 Descent

-
 
 Uncertain/purported/legendary descent

See also
 Kebra Nagast
 Fetha Negest
 History of Ethiopia
 Monarchies of Ethiopia

Notes

External links 
 Rasta Ites – List of Ethiopian Kings
 Crown Council of Ethiopia

 
History of Ethiopia
Descent from antiquity
Dynasty genealogy